George Samuel May (December 3, 1858 – 1922) was a merchant and politician in Ontario, Canada. He represented the riding of Ottawa in the Legislative Assembly of Ontario from 1905 to 1908 as a Liberal.

The son of George May and Elizabeth N. Cobb, he was born in Montreal and was educated in Ottawa. In 1884, he married Hattie Elizabeth Taylor. May served 16 years as a member of the Ottawa Public School Board.

References

External links 
 

1858 births
1922 deaths
Ontario Liberal Party MPPs